Nikola Korica (born 8 November 1960) is a Bosnian bobsledder. He competed in the two man and the four man events at the 1984 Winter Olympics, representing Yugoslavia.

References

1960 births
Living people
Yugoslav male bobsledders
Bosnia and Herzegovina male bobsledders
Olympic bobsledders of Yugoslavia
Bobsledders at the 1984 Winter Olympics
Sportspeople from Gospić